Aakhri Station (English: The Last Station) is a seven-part Pakistani television drama mini-series, created by Sarmad Khoosat and Kashf Foundation. It premiered on ARY Digital on 13 February 2018 and concluded on 28 March 2018. Directed and co-produced by Khoosat, it is written by Amna Mufti and is produced by Khoosat, Roshaneh Zafar of Kashf Foundation Productions and Australian Department of Foreign Affairs and Trade. It is directed by Sarmad Khoosat and written by Amna Mufti. Series consist of seven episodes.

The show introduced an ensemble cast with Sanam Saeed, Nimrah Bucha, Malika Zafar, Anam Goher, Eman Suleman, Ammara Butt and Farah Tufail portraying seven strangers with different economic, social and cultural backgrounds suffering from domestic and mental issues, meets on a train compartment en route to Karachi. The show aims to explore women-eccentric subjects that its creator feel have not been emphasized in Pakistani shows openly, such as women's rights, drug abuse, HIV, PTSD, acid attacks, forced prostitution, and domestic violence.

The OST, a beautiful rendition of an Amjad Islam Amjad poem, ‘Mujhe Apne Jeenay Ka Haq Chaihiye‘ has been composed by Arshad Mahmood and sung by Tahira Syed. The last verse of the poem is recited by Indian actress Shabana Azmi.

Synopsis
Each episode explores a different story based on women's empowerment and social issues affecting women, especially in Pakistan.

Cast 
Sanam Saeed as Tehmina
Eman Suleman as Yasmeen
Nimra Bucha as Shabana
Ammara Butt as Gul Meena
Malika Zafar as Farzana
Anam Goher as Shumaila
Farah Tufail as Rafiya
Adeel Afzal as Parvez  
Irfan Khoosat as Train ticket checker
Mikaal Zulfiqar as Rehan; cameo
Shah Fahad as Sajjad; Farzana's husband
Adnan Sarwar as Waqar; Yasmeen's husband
Sarmad Khoosat as Narrater (voice cameo)
Tipu Sultan
Faadil
Sara Khawaja
Razia Malik
Faryal Butt
Salman Gohar
Ameer Hamza
M Arman

References

External links 
Official website

2018 Pakistani television series debuts
Pakistani drama television series